
Gmina Sońsk is a rural gmina (administrative district) in Ciechanów County, Masovian Voivodeship, in east-central Poland.

Villages
Gmina Sońsk contains the villages and settlements of Bądkowo, Bieńki-Karkuty, Bieńki-Skrzekoty, Bieńki-Śmietanki, Burkaty, Chrościce, Chrościce-Łyczki, Cichawy, Ciemniewko, Ciemniewo, Damięty-Narwoty, Drążewo, Gąsocin, Gołotczyzna, Gutków, Kałęczyn, Komory Błotne, Komory Dąbrowne, Kosmy-Pruszki, Koźniewo Średnie, Koźniewo Wielkie, Koźniewo-Łysaki, Łopacin, Marusy, Mężenino-Węgłowice, Niesłuchy, Olszewka, Ostaszewo, Pękawka, Sarnowa Góra, Skrobocin, Ślubowo, Soboklęszcz, Sońsk, Spądoszyn, Strusin, Strusinek, Szwejki and Wola Ostaszewska.

Neighbouring gminas
Gmina Sońsk is bordered by the gminas of Ciechanów, Gołymin-Ośrodek, Gzy, Nowe Miasto, Ojrzeń, Sochocin and Świercze.

References

Polish official population figures 2006

Sonsk
Ciechanów County